Westfield Topanga is a shopping mall in the Canoga Park neighborhood of Los Angeles, California. It has  of gross leasable area and is anchored by department stores Macy's, Neiman Marcus, Nordstrom, and Target. The mall has been owned by Westfield-affiliated companies since 1993, and has been owned by the present-day Unibail-Rodamco-Westfield since 2017.

History 
Opened on February 10, 1964, Topanga Plaza was one of California's first major enclosed shopping mall. The original anchors were May Company, Montgomery Ward, and The Broadway. The "Rain Fountain" on the south end consisted of several circular arrays of vertical monofilament lines stretching from the ceiling to a raised landscaped area on the floor. The effect of the rain was created by droplets of recirculated glycerine slowly descending along the wetted lines.

An indoor ice skating rink was located in the basement of the southern section of the mall. The ice skating rink was closed in the late 1970s.

In April 1984, Nordstrom opened as the mall's fourth anchor.

In 1992, the original developer May Centers, Inc., was renamed CenterMark Properties and was sold by parent company May Department Stores in 1993 to a consortium led by Westfield Holdings, Ltd., a predecessor of Westfield Group.

In 1993, the May Company store rebranded as Robinsons-May. 
Three years later, The Broadway closed. As a result of the closure, Sears moved in and relocated from its nearby Fallbrook Center mall.

In 2001, Montgomery Ward closed as a result of the chain's liquidation.

In 2005, Nordstrom relocated on the Sears side of the mall. Alongside, the Wards store got demolished, replacing it with a two-story Target store, which opened a year later.

In 2006, Robinsons-May rebranded as Macy's, as well as the opening of Target.

In 2008, Neiman Marcus opened as its fifth anchor, which replaced the original Nordstrom store.

On January 28, 2015, it was announced Sears would shutter during a series of store closures.

In September 2015, Westfield opened a major expansion of Westfield Topanga, called The Village at Westfield Topanga. The open-air shopping destination was located along Topanga Canyon Boulevard, and sits between the Westfield Topanga and the largely-inactive Promenade mall. The Village will continue to operate as an open-air lifestyle and retail destination with the Promenade mall and a former Anthem office building being redeveloped into the Rams' headquarters and practice facility.

Westfield turned the former Sears department store space into an entertainment district featuring a new food hall, retail center, and 12-screen AMC Theatre. The theater, dubbed "AMC DINE-IN Topanga 12", opened on June 2, 2022. Some food options include bacon chicken mac & cheese bowl, chicken cobb salad, royal bacon brie burger, chocolate hazelnut churros and mega milkshakes, which is cooked on the premise and delivered directly to the patron's assigned seating area.

In popular culture 
1967 film, Divorce American Style, starring Dick Van Dyke, Debbie Reynolds, Jean Simmons, Jason Robards, and Van Johnson. Scene used was Barbara Harmon (Reynolds) and Fern Blandsforth (Emmaline Henry) shopping. The pair stand and have a conversation next to a pillar (left side of screen) that says Topanga Plaza.

2002 One Hour Photo, starring Robin Williams, Connie Nielsen, Eriq La Salle and Gary Cole.

2014 Marvel film Captain America: The Winter Soldier. The scene used in the film was shot in the Apple Store.

2009 The NBC comedy Parks and Recreation filmed scenes at Westfield Topanga during an episode of the fourth season entitled "Pawnee Rangers."

2015 The Last Man On Earth, starring Will Forte and Kristen Schaal.

Parking
The Owensmouth Garage in the east entrance to the mall connects to Blaze Pizza, Nordstrom and Gyu-Kaku and in 2015, the 5th level became staff parking. Next to it is an additional parking lot that connects Target and Macy's. Facing Topanga Canyon Blvd., an additional enclosed parking lot is available which connects Red Robin, and Total Woman Gym and Spa. There is also a large outdoor parking lot available which connects to Level 2's Forever XXI and The Cheesecake Factory. The Village, across the street from Victory Blvd., has paid 90 minute parking facing Topanga Cyn. Blvd., and an enclosed 5 story parking structure with dedicated Costco (Mezzanine) parking along with 4 additional lots. Valet services are offered throughout both the Westfield Topanga and Village properties along with car detailing services.

List of anchor stores

References

External links
 

Topanga
Shopping malls in the San Fernando Valley
Canoga Park, Los Angeles
Woodland Hills, Los Angeles
1964 establishments in California
Shopping malls established in 1964
Shopping malls in Los Angeles